USCGC Stratton (WMSL-752) is the third  of the United States Coast Guard. It is the first "white hull" cutter named after a woman since the 1980s ( was launched in 1984). Stratton is named for Coast Guard Captain Dorothy C. Stratton (1899–2006). Stratton served as director of the SPARS, the Coast Guard Women's Reserve during World War II.

History
Construction began in 2008 by Northrop Grumman's Ship System Ingalls Shipyard in Pascagoula, Mississippi. The keel was laid on July 20, 2009. The cutter's sponsor is Michelle Obama, who is the first First Lady to sponsor a Coast Guard cutter.

On 23 July 2010 Michelle Obama christened the cutter in a ceremony at the ship builder's.

In August 2011, Stratton completed sea trials. On September 2, 2011 Stratton was acquired by the Coast Guard. On December 19, 2011 Stratton arrived in San Francisco, pier 27, for its inaugural homecoming visit to the Bay area.

On March 31, 2012, Stratton was officially commissioned by the Coast Guard in Alameda, California, with First Lady Michelle Obama in attendance.

In April 2012, the crew of Stratton discovered four holes in the hull and the ship was sent to drydock to have these repaired.

On July 18, 2015, Stratton intercepted a semi-submersible loaded with approximately 16,000 pounds of cocaine. Stratton was able to offload more than 12,000 pounds worth an estimated $181 million before the craft sank. It is estimated to be the largest such seizure of its kind.

In July 2015, Insitu UAS demonstrated how ScanEagle can maximize the effectiveness of USCG vessels, the exercise also showcased the platform's ability to conduct seamless, concurrent aviation operations with manned aircraft.

On June 13, 2019, the Stratton departed for a Western Pacific patrol in support of the U.S. Indo-Pacific Command where the cutter would operate under tactical control of the United States Seventh Fleet commander. During this patrol, the Stratton would enforce United Nations Security Council resolutions against the Democratic People's Republic of Korea, combat illegal fishing, conduct capacity-building exercises with navies and coast guards, and would also participate in various military exercises and training's, including Maritime Training Activity Malaysia 2019, Cooperation Afloat Readiness and Training Indonesia 2019, and Exercise Talisman Saber. 
 

During Exercise Talisman Saber the cutter Stratton was a part of an amphibious readiness group that conducted an exercise to move Marines and associated equipment ashore in a simulated hostile environment, the cutter would act as a forward screen vessel and also provided fire support for the Marines during the landing. During the patrol the cutters crew would conduct surface warfare training, including drills to defend against a missile attack on the cutter. The Stratton returned to Alameda California on November 22, 2019, during the 162-day patrol the cutter visited ports in Fiji, Australia, Indonesia, Malaysia and the Philippines.

See also 
 Integrated Deepwater System Program

References

External links 

USCGC STRATTON (WMSL 752) Web Site
National Security Cutter Gallery
National Security Cutter Home
CGC Stratton Coat of Arms – Institute of Heraldry
Michelle Obama's letter
USCGC Stratton – usmilnet.com pictures and articles

Legend-class cutters
Ships of the United States Coast Guard
2010 ships
Ships built in Pascagoula, Mississippi